Recz  is a town in Choszczno County, West Pomeranian Voivodeship, Poland, with a population of 3,001 as of 2004.

History
In 1373 Recz became part of the Lands of the Bohemian Crown (or Czech Lands), ruled by the Luxembourg dynasty. In 1402, the Luxembourgs reached an agreement with Poland in Kraków. Poland was to buy and re-incorporate Recz and its surroundings, but eventually the Luxembourgs sold the town to the Teutonic Order, whose rule lasted until 1454.

During the Polish-Swedish War, in 1657 the town was captured by Poles. From the 18th century it was part of the Kingdom of Prussia and subsequently in 1871 it became part of Germany. After the defeat of Nazi Germany in 1945, it became part of Poland.

Gallery

Notable residents
 Daniel Cramer (Daniel Candidus) (1568–1637), German Lutheran theologian 
 Franz Eisenach (1918–1998), Luftwaffe fighter ace
 Marie Schlei (1919–1983), German politician

External links
 Official town webpage

Recz
Choszczno County